The following is a timeline of classical mechanics:

Early mechanics
 4th century BC - Aristotle invents the system of Aristotelian physics, which is later largely disproved
 4th century BC - Babylonian astronomers calculate Jupiter's position using the mean speed theorem
 260 BC - Archimedes works out the principle of the lever and connects buoyancy to weight
 60 - Hero of Alexandria writes Metrica, Mechanics (on means to lift heavy objects), and Pneumatics (on machines working on pressure)
 350 - Themistius states, that static friction is larger than kinetic friction
 6th century - John Philoponus introduces the concept of impetus
 6th century - John Philoponus says that by observation, two balls of very different weights will fall at nearly the same speed. He therefore tests the equivalence principle
 1021 - Al-Biruni uses three orthogonal coordinates to describe point in space
 1100-1138 - Avempace develops the concept of a fatigue, which according to Shlomo Pines is precursor to Leibnizian idea of force
 1100-1165 - Hibat Allah Abu'l-Barakat al-Baghdaadi discovers that force is proportional to acceleration rather than speed, a fundamental law in classical mechanics
 1340-1358 - Jean Buridan develops the theory of impetus
 14th century - Oxford Calculators and French collaborators prove the mean speed theorem
 14th century - Nicole Oresme derives the times-squared law for uniformly accelerated change. Oresme, however, regarded this discovery as a purely intellectual exercise having no relevance to the description of any natural phenomena, and consequently failed to recognise any connection with the motion of accelerating bodies
 1500-1528 - Al-Birjandi develops the theory of "circular inertia" to explain Earth's rotation
 16th century - Francesco Beato and Luca Ghini experimentally contradict Aristotelian view on free fall.
 16th century - Domingo de Soto suggests that bodies falling through a homogeneous medium are uniformly accelerated. Soto, however, did not anticipate many of the qualifications and refinements contained in Galileo's theory of falling bodies. He did not, for instance, recognise, as Galileo did, that a body would fall with a strictly uniform acceleration only in a vacuum, and that it would otherwise eventually reach a uniform terminal velocity
 1581 - Galileo Galilei notices the timekeeping property of the pendulum
 1589 - Galileo Galilei uses balls rolling on inclined planes to show that different weights fall with the same acceleration
 1638 - Galileo Galilei publishes Dialogues Concerning Two New Sciences (which were materials science and kinematics) where he develops, amongst other things, Galilean transformation
 1644 - René Descartes suggests an early form of the law of conservation of momentum
 1645 - Ismaël Bullialdus argues that "gravity" weakens as the inverse square of the distance
 1651 - Giovanni Battista Riccioli and Francesco Maria Grimaldi discover the Coriolis effect
 1658 - Christiaan Huygens experimentally discovers that balls placed anywhere inside an inverted cycloid reach the lowest point of the 	cycloid in the same time and thereby experimentally shows that the cycloid is the tautochrone
 1668 - John Wallis suggests the law of conservation of momentum
 1673 - Christiaan Huygens publishes his Horologium Oscillatorium. Huygens describes in this work the first two laws of motion. The book is also the first modern treatise in which a physical problem (the accelerated motion of a falling body) is idealized by a set of parameters and then analyzed mathematically.
 1676-1689 - Gottfried Leibniz develops the concept of vis viva, a limited theory of conservation of energy
 1677 - Baruch Spinoza puts forward a primitive notion of Newton's first law

Formation of classical mechanics
 1687 -   Isaac Newton publishes his Philosophiae Naturalis Principia Mathematica, in which he formulates Newton's laws of motion and Newton's law of universal gravitation
 1690 -   James Bernoulli shows that the cycloid is the solution to the tautochrone problem
 1691 -   Johann Bernoulli shows that a chain freely suspended from two points will form a catenary
 1691 -   James Bernoulli shows that the catenary curve has the lowest center of gravity of any chain hung from two fixed points
 1696 -   Johann Bernoulli shows that the cycloid is the solution to the brachistochrone problem
 1707 -   Gottfried Leibniz probably develops the principle of least action
 1710 -   Jakob Hermann shows that Laplace–Runge–Lenz vector is conserved for a case of the inverse-square central force
 1714 -   Brook Taylor derives the fundamental frequency of a stretched vibrating string in terms of its tension and mass per unit length by solving an ordinary differential equation
 1733 -   Daniel Bernoulli derives the fundamental frequency and harmonics of a hanging chain by solving an ordinary differential equation
 1734 -   Daniel Bernoulli solves the ordinary differential equation for the vibrations of an elastic bar clamped at one end
 1739 -   Leonhard Euler solves the ordinary differential equation for a forced harmonic oscillator and notices the resonance
 1742 -   Colin Maclaurin discovers his uniformly rotating self-gravitating spheroids
 1743 -   Jean le Rond d'Alembert publishes his Traite de Dynamique, in which he introduces the concept of generalized forces and D'Alembert's principle
 1747 -   D'Alembert and Alexis Clairaut publish first approximate solutions to the three-body problem 
 1749 -   Leonhard Euler derives equation for Coriolis acceleration
 1759 -   Leonhard Euler solves the partial differential equation for the vibration of a rectangular drum
 1764 -   Leonhard Euler examines the partial differential equation for the vibration of a circular drum and finds one of the Bessel function solutions
 1776 -   John Smeaton publishes a paper on experiments relating power, work, momentum and kinetic energy, and supporting the conservation of energy
 1788 -   Joseph Louis Lagrange presents Lagrange's equations of motion in the Méchanique Analytique
 1789 -   Antoine Lavoisier states the law of conservation of mass
 1803 -   Louis Poinsot develops idea of angular momentum conservation (this result was previously known only in the case of conservation of areal velocity)
 1813 -   Peter Ewart supports the idea of the conservation of energy in his paper "On the measure of moving force"
 1821 -   William Hamilton begins his analysis of Hamilton's characteristic function and Hamilton–Jacobi equation
 1829 -   Carl Friedrich Gauss introduces Gauss's principle of least constraint
 1834 -   Carl Jacobi discovers his uniformly rotating self-gravitating ellipsoids
 1834 -   Louis Poinsot notes an instance of the intermediate axis theorem
 1835 -   William Hamilton states Hamilton's canonical equations of motion
 1838 -   Liouville begins work on Liouville's theorem
 1841 -   Julius Robert von Mayer, an amateur scientist, writes a paper on the conservation of energy but his lack of academic training leads to its rejection
 1847 -   Hermann von Helmholtz formally states the law of conservation of energy
 first half of the 19th century - Cauchy develops his momentum equation and his stress tensor
 1851 -   Léon Foucault shows the Earth's rotation with a huge pendulum (Foucault pendulum) 
 1870 -   Rudolf Clausius deduces virial theorem
 1902 -   James Jeans finds the length scale required for gravitational perturbations to grow in a static nearly homogeneous medium
 1915 -   Emmy Noether proves Noether's theorem, from which conservation laws are deduced
 1952 -   Parker develops a tensor form of the virial theorem
 1978 -   Vladimir Arnold states precise form of Liouville–Arnold theorem
 1983 -   Mordehai Milgrom proposes Modified Newtonian dynamics
 1992 -   Udwadia and Kalaba create Udwadia–Kalaba equation

References

Physics timelines
Mathematics timelines